Deep River Pioneer Lutheran Church is a historic Gothic Revival style church in Deep River, Washington. It was added to the National Register of Historic Places in 1974.

The church was the area's first organized Evangelical Lutheran Church. Construction by a community of Finnish settlers began in 1898 and was completed in 1902. The church became inactive in the 1930s following the decline of its congregation. Its interior has remained largely unchanged over time. A 2012 restoration of the church's exterior included repainting of the white siding and peach-colored trim after the removal of a large buildup of moss. The church is usually open for viewing during Deep Water's Finnish-American Folk Festival.

References

Lutheran churches in Washington (state)
Churches on the National Register of Historic Places in Washington (state)
Carpenter Gothic church buildings in Washington (state)
Churches completed in 1902
Buildings and structures in Wahkiakum County, Washington
National Register of Historic Places in Wahkiakum County, Washington